Richard Ruegg Kershaw (16 April 1934 – 28 April 2014) was a British television reporter and interviewer.

Born in London, he was educated at Cheltenham College (an independent school for boys) in England. He was then called up for National Service as a second lieutenant in the Royal Artillery, serving in Germany before studying at Clare College, Cambridge for a history degree and later at the University of Virginia Graduate School in the USA.

He was best known for his contributions as a reporter to the BBC's Panorama current affairs series. Later he joined Nationwide. He was also a reporter on other BBC current affairs programmes including 24 hours, Newsday, Newsweek and general election night broadcasts. He died aged 80 on 28 April 2014.

References

External links

1934 births
2014 deaths
Alumni of Clare College, Cambridge
BBC newsreaders and journalists
British reporters and correspondents
Panorama (British TV programme)
People educated at Cheltenham College